Zálezlice is a municipality and village in Mělník District in the Central Bohemian Region of the Czech Republic. It has about 400 inhabitants.

Administrative parts
Villages of Kozárovice and Zátvor are administrative parts of Zálezlice.

Geography
It lies in a flat landscape in the Central Elbe Table. The municipality is situated on the right bank of the Vltava River.

History
The first written mention of Zálezlice is from the beginning of the 13th century.

The municipality was badly damaged during the 2002 European floods and has been protected by a flood wall since then.

Sights
The landmark of Zálezlice is the Church of Saint Nicholas. It is a late Baroque building from the second half of the 18th century. The church includes a Baroque mortuary.

Notable people
Vítězslav Hálek (1835–1874), poet, writer and journalist; lived here in 1841–1842

Gallery

References

External links

Villages in Mělník District